Tue Brook railway station was located on the north side of West Derby Road, Tuebrook, Liverpool, England, opposite Newsham Park on the Canada Dock Branch.

History
The station opened on 1 July 1870 and closed to passengers on 31 May 1948. Trains to and from Seaforth Dock still pass through the station site.

Future

Merseytravel have made several mentions of re-opening the station as part of a plan of using the Canada Dock/Bootle Branch for passenger services. The October 2017 Liverpool City Region Combined Authority update to the Long Term Rail Strategy mentions the re-opening of the line to passenger use with new stations at Anfield, Tue Brook and Edge Lane.

References

Sources

External links
 The station's history Disused Stations
 The station and local lines on multiple maps Rail Maps Online
 The station on an Edwardian 25" OS map National Library of Scotland
 The branch with stations and mileages Railway Codes

Disused railway stations in Liverpool
Former London and North Western Railway stations
Railway stations in Great Britain opened in 1870
Railway stations in Great Britain closed in 1948